The Ford AJD engine was first developed as a V6 with a clean-sheet architecture and variable valve timing by Ford of Europe for its then subsidiaries Jaguar Cars and Land Rover, as well as for its partner PSA Peugeot Citroën working under the Gemini joint development and production agreement. It is called the AJD-V6 in the Jaguar and Land Rover vehicles and the DT17/DT20 by Citroën and Peugeot. The engines share the same bore/stroke ratio, with the V6 displacing  and the V8 displacing . The V6 was launched in 2004 and the V8 in 2006. The V6 engine meets the Euro IV emissions standards. A DT20  was added in 2009 and is based on the DT17 . The V6 is used across many vehicles, from the Citroën C5 and C6, to the Land Rover Discovery, Range Rover, multiple cars in the Jaguar range, and also the Ford Territory and next gen Ford Ranger.

Common Construction 
The engine family utilises twin overhead camshafts and multi-valves, single or twin-turbochargers with an air-to-air intercooler, and innovative compacted graphite iron (CGI) block construction that leads to a low weight of  dry. Fuel supply is high-pressure common rail direct injection.

Lion V6

To improve the engine's low-speed torque range for off-roading and towing applications, the Land Rover variant utilised a large capacity single-turbocharger, rather than use the twin-turbo design; in addition the engine is fitted with a large engine driven cooling fan to support low speed, high load driving as may be encountered in desert conditions. Furthermore, the Land Rover variant of the Lion V6 includes a deeper, high capacity sump with improved baffles to maintain oil pressure at off-roading extreme angles and multi-layered seals to keep dust, mud and water at bay and different transmission bell housing bolt pattern. The Lion V6 – constructed from compacted graphite iron – is a member of the Ford Duratorq family and is produced at Ford's Dagenham engine plant; 35,000 engines were produced from April to December 2004.

The 3.0-litre design, known as the Gen III, superseded the 2.7-litre, and uses turbochargers on a series-sequential system and has an uprated common rail injection system incorporating fuel injectors with piezo crystals fitted nearer to the tip to reduce engine noise and a metering mode to reduce oversupplying fuel, decreasing fuel consumption and unused fuel temperature over the 2.7-litre model.
The sequential turbocharger system utilizes the smaller of the two turbos when the engine is running at low revolutions; once the engine has reached 2,800 rpm, the larger turbocharger is also used to pressurize the intake.

Jaguar tested fitting the engine to its XK model but didn't carry the project over to production.

The 3.0-litre variants used by Land Rover feature the 2.7-litre's off-roading adaptations plus calibration of the engine's electronics to allow the use of low-quality fuels.

2.7HDi/TDV6/2.7TD
Engine configuration & engine displacement
60-degree V6 engine, single- and twin-turbo diesel, bore x stroke , compression ratio 17.3:1
Cylinder block & crankcase
Compacted graphite iron cross bolted block 
Cylinder heads & valvetrain
High strength aluminium, DOHC with four valves per cylinder
Aspiration
Single turbocharger or twin-turbochargers with air-to-air intercooler, electronically actuated variable geometry with transient over-boost capability, port deactivation system
Fuel system & engine management
DIN-rated motive power & torque outputs
,  – Ford Territory, Land Rover Discovery 3, Range Rover Sport
,  – Citroën C5, Citroën C6, Jaguar S-Type, Jaguar XF, Jaguar XJ, Peugeot 407, Peugeot 607
References
"Ford, PSA Announce New V6 Diesel" Auto Report, 10 June 2003

3.0HDi/TDV6/SDV6
Engine configuration & engine displacement
60-degree V6 engine, twin-turbo diesel, bore x stroke , compression ratio 16.4:1
Cylinder block & crankcase
Compacted graphite iron cross bolted block 
Cylinder heads & valvetran
High strength aluminium, DOHC with 4 valves per cylinder
Aspiration
Twin-turbochargers with air-to-air intercooler, electronically actuated variable geometry with transient over-boost capability, port deactivation system
Fuel system & engine management
DIN-rated motive power & torque outputs
,  – Citroën C5, Citroën C6, Peugeot 407, Peugeot 407 Coupé
,  – Jaguar XF, Land Rover Discovery 4, Range Rover Sport
,  – Land Rover Discovery 4, Discovery 5, Range Rover Sport
,  – Jaguar XF, Jaguar XJ, Range Rover
,  – Jaguar XF, Jaguar XJ, Range Rover Velar, Jaguar F-Pace
,  – Range Rover Sport, Discovery 5

Lion V8 
See also Ford 4.4 Turbo Diesel
Built at Ford's Dagenham engine plant in Essex, the 3.6-litre V8 twin-turbo diesel engine began production in April 2006. The 4.4l TD variant is built in Ford's Chihuahua Engine plant in Mexico.

Much speculation in the United States has focused on this engine as a possible Diesel entrant in the F-150 pickup truck and Expedition SUV. It was announced that the new F150 engine was to be based on this engine and enlarged to 4.4L, but that program was later cancelled.  The Cleveland Engine plant recently began small-scale production of the exotic compacted graphite iron (CGI) used in the block's construction, leading many to expect production of the engine there.  Ultimately, Ford went with the 3.0 Lion V6 modified for US truck use, and utilizing a single turbocharger.

3.6 TDV8
Engine configuration & engine displacement
90-degree V8 engine, twin-turbo diesel, bore x stroke , compression ratio 17.3:1
Cylinder block & crankcase
Compacted graphite iron cross bolted block 
Cylinder heads & valvetrain
High strength aluminium, DOHC with 4 valves per cylinder
Aspiration
DIN-rated motive power & torque outputs
,  – Range Rover, Range Rover Sport

See also
 List of Ford engines

Notes

References

External links

AJD-V6
DT17
Diesel engines by model
Jaguar engines
V6 engines
V8 engines